Tracy Silverman (born April 7, 1960) is an American violinist, composer, and producer.

Biography 
Born in Peekskill, New York and raised in Beloit, Wisconsin, he attended Beloit Memorial High School but left after two years when he was sixteen to enter the Chicago Musical College. He graduated from the  Juilliard School and performs contemporary classical music, avant-garde jazz, and rock, mainly on the six-string electric violin as well as other fretted and fretless acoustic and electric instruments.

He recorded his debut solo album for Windham Hill and appeared on many of the label's compilations. He was a violinist with the Turtle Island String Quartet and has performed with pianist Jim Brickman and composer Terry Riley.

He performed at the gala opening of Walt Disney Concert Hall in Los Angeles where he was the featured soloist in the premiere of John Adams's composition The Dharma at Big Sur, written specifically for Silverman and his 6-string electric violin.

Silverman is the author of "The Strum Bowing Method: How to Groove on Strings" and has taught at  Belmont University in Nashville, Tennessee. He has also been an instructor at Mark O'Connor's String Camps as well as The Mark Wood Rock Orchestra Camp.

Discography

As leader or co-leader
 Trip to the Sun (Windham Hill, 1999)
 Yangin' with the Yin Crowd (Gutbucket, 2001)
 Superstring (with Ferdinand Forsch) (Atelier, 2002 )
 North Meets South (with Caito Marcondes) (Nucleo Contemporaneo, 2002)
 I'd Rather Be Dreaming (2004)
 Streaming Video Soul (2008)
 Three Part Invention (with Philip Aaberg, Eugene Friesen) (Sweetgrass, 2009)
 May All Good Things (2010)
 Between the Kiss and the Chaos (Delos, 2014)
 Resonance 2.3 (2015)
 Live from Matthew's Opera House (with Roy ("Futureman") Wooten (2018)

With the Turtle Island String Quartet
 Who Do We Think We Are?  (Windham Hill, 1994)
 A Night in Tunisia, A Week in Detroit  (Chandos, 1994)
 By the Fireside (1995)

As guest
 On A Starry Night (Windham Hill, 1997)
 John Adams: The Dharma at Big Sur (Nonesuch, 2006)
 Palmian Chord Ryddle (2017)
 The Three Generations Trio'' (2017)

References

External links
 Official website

Living people
American jazz violinists
American male violinists
Juilliard School alumni
People from Beloit, Wisconsin
Musicians from New York (state)
Windham Hill Records artists
Belmont University faculty
Musicians from Wisconsin
Macalester College faculty
Nonesuch Records artists
Chicago Musical College alumni
21st-century American violinists
21st-century American male musicians
American male jazz musicians
Turtle Island Quartet members
1960 births